Holi is a spring festival, also known as the festival of colours or the festival of love.

Holi may also refer to:
 Holi (1940 film), a 1940 Hindi/Urdu social drama film
 Holi (1984 film), an Indian coming of age drama film directed by Ketan Mehta
 Holi (2002 film), an Indian Telugu film, directed by SVN Vara Prasad
 Holi (singer), alias of Akiko Kobayashi, Japanese singer, songwriter, composer and arranger

See also
 Holi, Punjab, Holi in the Punjab region
 Antti Hölli (born 1987), Finnish ice hockey player
 Holika, a demoness in Hindu Vedic scriptures
 Holík, a surname (including a list of people with the name)